Peter Castle Floud CBE, (1 June 1911 – 22 January 1960) was a British civil servant and official of the United Nations Relief and Rehabilitation Administration, administering missions in Egypt, Iran, and Albania.  He was also an authority on William Morris.

Early life

The elder son of Sir Francis Floud KCB KCSI, KCMG, DCL, he was born together with twin sister Molly (m. du Sautoy) on 1 June 1911. Peter Floud was the brother of the politician Bernard Floud. Both brothers were educated at Gresham's School, Holt, and Wadham College, Oxford.

After graduating in 1931, Peter passed the Civil Service Examination for admission to the Civil Service. He was admitted to the London School of Economics for research in the history of the industrial arts in Britain with special reference to the work of William Morris.

In 1938 he married the sociologist Jean MacDonald (CBE) with whom he had three children, Andrew, Frances and Esther.

Career outline
1935–1939: Assistant-Keeper, Victoria and Albert Museum
1939–1944: Served for the London Regional Headquarters of the Ministry of Home Security
1944–1946: Administrator of UNRRA Balkan and Middle East Missions in Cairo and Teheran
1946/1947: Chief of UNRRA Mission to Albania
1947–1960: Keeper, Department of Circulation at the Victoria and Albert Museum
1950–1953: Chairman of the Children's Section of the International Council of Museums
1955: Made a Governor of the National Museum of Wales

The Department of Circulation, Victoria and Albert Museum
More information on the Circulation Department
Floud joined the staff of the Victoria and Albert Museum in 1935 as an Assistant Keeper in the Department of Circulation, which sent touring exhibitions around the UK. He broke off his work with the museum on the outbreak of war but returned following the completion of his secondment to the Department of Home Security and was made Keeper of the Department of Circulation. Together with a team of three women, - Barbara Morris, Shirley Bury and Elizabeth Aslin - Peter broke important ground in the study of the history of industrial arts. The great achievement of this team was a ground-breaking exhibition titled 'Victorian and Edwardian Decorative Arts,' which was staged in 1952. It proved unexpectedly popular with the public and put the V&A at the forefront of the revival of interest in Victorian progressive design. Peter's work for the museum was recognised in 1954 by his appointment as CBE. In 1955 he was made a Governor of the National Museum of Wales as part of his museum work. Floud was praised as 'that rare kind of scholar who was able to apply to the material culture of his own day his vast store of knowledge and his ability to discriminate'.

Death
Peter Floud died on 22 January 1960, aged 48, from an inoperable brain tumor.

References

 Who's Who 1960 (A & C. Black, London, 1960)
 V & A Obituary (The Times, 1960)
 Article on Oxford Spy Ring by Ben Macintyre and Steve Bird (The Times 2009)
 Stub Article on Oxford Spy Ring by Steve Bird (The Times, 2009)

1911 births
1960 deaths
People educated at Gresham's School
Alumni of Wadham College, Oxford
Commanders of the Order of the British Empire
British officials of the United Nations